Ajmer Junction railway station (station code: AII) is located in Ajmer district in the Indian state of Rajasthan .

History
Initially it was built as a metre-gauge (MG) station with lines from Chittaurgarh Junction railway station, Ahmedabad Junction railway station, Phulera Junction railway station. In the 1990s, the Delhi–Jaipur line and Jaipur–Ahmedabad line were converted to broad gauge (BG). Then the station had a parallel BG – MG  lines coming from north from Phulera Junction railway station, and after the station the MG line to Chittaurgarh crossed over to the Southeast side while the BG continued Southwest to Beawar railway station and Ahmedabad Junction railway station. Finally, somewhere in 2007, the line going toward Ratlam Junction railway station to Chittaurgarh was converted to BG.

Location and layout
Ajmer Junction (station code: AII) is an important railway junction having five platforms and situated in the heart of the city. Other Suburban Station of Ajmer are Khwaja Gareeb Nawaz Madar Junction (MDJN), Daurai (DOZ), and Adarsh Nagar (AHO). It has a railway complex, which includes a major workshop.

Branchings

References

External links 

Railway stations in Ajmer district
Ajmer railway division
Transport in Ajmer
Buildings and structures in Ajmer
Railway junction stations in Rajasthan